The University Athletic Association of the Philippines Season 75 basketball tournaments are the basketball events of UAAP's 2012-13 season. National University is the host this season. The opening ceremony was held on July 14, 2012, followed by doubleheader basketball games after the ceremonies at the Mall of Asia Arena.

The UAAP named former San Beda Red Cubs head coach Ato Badolato as commissioner for basketball. Badolato also served as basketball commissioner for UAAP Season 73.

Men's tournament

Teams

Coaching changes 

Following the resignation of head coach Dindo Pumaren last September, the De La Salle Green Archers have tapped Gee Abanilla as his replacement. Abanilla previously served as assistant coach for La Salle under former head coach Franz Pumaren and for the Petron Blaze Boosters prior to accepting the head coaching job. In the preseason, he led the Green Archers to a 1st runner-up finish at the Filoil tournament.

Elimination round

Team standings

Schedule

Results

Fourth-seed playoff

Bracket

Semifinals
In the semifinals, the higher seed has the twice-to-beat advantage, where they only have to win once, while their opponents twice, to progress.

Ateneo vs. La Salle

UST vs. NU

Finals

 Finals Most Valuable Player:

Awards

 Most Valuable Player: 
 Rookie of the Year: 
 Mythical Five:
 
 
 
 
 
 Game Changing Player of the Season: 
 Todo Bigay Player of the Year: 
 Champ of the Season: 
 Maaasahan Player of the Year:

Women's tournament

Elimination round

Team standings

Schedule

Results

Fourth-seed playoff

Bracket

Stepladder semifinals

First round

Second round
In the semifinals, La Salle has the twice-to-beat advantage, where they only have to win once, while their opponents twice, to progress.

Finals
FEU has to win two times, while their opponent has to win three times.

Finals Most Valuable Player:

Awards

 Most Valuable Player: 
 Rookie of the Year: 
 Mythical Five:

Juniors' tournament

Elimination round

Team standings

Schedule

Results

Bracket

Semifinals
In the semifinals, the higher seed has the twice-to-beat advantage, where they only have to win once, while their opponents twice, to progress.

FEU vs. Ateneo

NU vs. UST

Finals

Awards

 Finals Most Valuable Player: 
 Season Most Valuable Player: 
 Rookie of the Year: 
 Mythical Five:

See also
NCAA Season 88 basketball tournaments

References

75
2012–13 in Philippine college basketball
Basket